Gangachara Sheikh Hasina Bridge is located on the river Teesta on the Lalmonirhat-Rangpur highway in Gangachara upazila of Rangpur district. The construction work of the bridge lasted from 2007 to June 2012. The bridge was inaugurated by the Hon'ble Prime Minister on 20 September 2012. The bridge is made of 16 individual spans on 16 pillars. The total cost of construction of the bridge is 1.2209 billion taka.

References

Bridges in Bangladesh
Rangpur District
Bridges completed in 2012
2012 establishments in Bangladesh